La Verkin is a city in Washington County, Utah, United States. The population was 4,060 as of 2010, an increase from 3,392 in 2000. La Verkin is within walking distance of Hurricane, and the two cities have historically had close ties.

Theories about the origin of the city's name suggest that it may be a corruption of the Spanish la virgen, after the nearby Virgin River, or possibly an error in the transcription of the term "beaver skin."

The city made national headlines in 2001 when the City Council passed an ordinance declaring La Verkin a "United Nations-free zone".

La Verkin contains the southernmost highway junction to Zion National Park, at the intersection of Utah SR-9. The city is also home to Pah Tempe Hot Springs, a historic volcanic sulfur spring that sits on the edge of Virgin River.

La Verkin Elementary School is the only public school in the city. Higher grades attend school in neighboring Hurricane. The city contains several large private schools for troubled youth, most visibly Cross Creek Academy.

La Verkin has continued its small, incremental growth through the years, despite geographical limitations. There is a single large, modern market (Davis Farmer's Market), which includes a fuel center. Two coffee shops, and a casual dining restaurant, catering to tourists and locals alike. 

Law Enforcement; La Verkin Police Department and Washington County Sheriff's Department. 
Fire Department; Hurricane Valley Fire Department.  
Power Department; Rocky Mountain Power, Ash Creek Water District, managed by La Verkin City Power Department.

Geography
According to the United States Census Bureau, the city has a total area of 16.1 square miles (41.8 km2), all land.

Climate
According to the Köppen Climate Classification system, La Verkin has a semi-arid climate, abbreviated "BSk" on climate maps.

Demographics

As of the census of 2000, there were 3,392 people, 1,053 households, and 840 families residing in the city. The population density was 210.3 people per square mile (81.2/km2). There were 1,158 housing units at an average density of 71.8 per square mile (27.7/km2). The racial makeup of the city was 93.81% White, 0.12% African American, 1.27% Native American, 0.21% Asian, 0.12% Pacific Islander, 1.92% from other races, and 2.56% from two or more races. Hispanic or Latino of any race were 4.60% of the population.

There were 1,053 households, out of which 44.6% had children under the age of 18 living with them, 66.3% were married couples living together, 9.6% had a female householder with no husband present, and 20.2% were non-families. 17.0% of all households were made up of individuals, and 7.5% had someone living alone who was 65 years of age or older. The average household size was 3.20 and the average family size was 3.61.

In the city, the population was spread out, with 35.8% under the age of 18, 9.1% from 18 to 24, 24.5% from 25 to 44, 17.5% from 45 to 64, and 13.1% who were 65 years of age or older. The median age was 29 years. For every 100 females, there were 98.9 males. For every 100 females age 18 and over, there were 94.0 males.

The median income for a household in the city was $35,949, and the median income for a family was $39,432. Males had a median income of $30,051 versus $19,602 for females. The per capita income for the city was $12,113. About 10.1% of families and 12.1% of the population were below the poverty line, including 15.7% of those under age 18 and 6.4% of those age 65 or over.

See also

 List of cities and towns in Utah

References

External links

 
 History of La Verkin from the Utah History Encyclopedia

Cities in Utah
Cities in Washington County, Utah
Populated places established in 1897
1897 establishments in Utah